The Evita Movement is a social, piquetero and political movement of Argentina, which is defined by Peronist, national, popular, and revolutionary ideology. Its name was adopted as a tribute to the argentine popular political leader and First Lady Eva Perón.

It was created in 2004 and was part of the Front for Victory. Its general secretary is Emilio Pérsico. Other major figures of the movement are National Deputies Leonardo Grosso (former chairman of the Movement's in the lower house), the journalist Fernando "Chino" Navarro, Gildo Onorato, Silvia Horne, Remo Carlotto, Lucila De Ponti, and Araceli Ferreyra, former senators Juan Manuel Abal Medina Jr. and Teresita Luna, and Evita-UTEP liaison Esteban Castro.

In 2016 it separated from the parliamentary bloc Front for Victory, forming one of its own called Peronism for Victory. Now, it supports Alberto Fernández and is part of Frente de Todos, a new Peronist coalition.

History
The Evita Movement emerged in 2004, as a result of the union of diverse groups from the Quebracho Revolutionary Patriotic Movement and the Anibal Verón Current of Unemployed Workers, with roots mainly in the suburbs of Buenos Aires.

In its first year, the Evita Movement organized itself as a piquetero unemployed movement (MTD), but later redefined its purpose to reorganize itself as a popular revolutionary wing of Kirchnerism, acting with ample autonomy both inside and outside the Justicialist Party (PJ). In 2007 Emilio Pérsico was named secretary of Territorial Organizations of the PJ. One of the unusual characteristics of the Evita Movement is that its electoral secretary has lacked interest in holding political office.

The Evita Movement, like other movements of the unemployed, grants a central role to the organization of its members to work cooperatively, mainly in the construction of popular housing, financed by the state. The popular power policy of the Evita Movement was explained in these terms by one of its members:

It participated in the 2017 legislative election, joining the Citizen's Unity electoral front.

Electoral performance

President

Chamber of Deputies

References

External links

2004 establishments in Argentina
Justicialist Party
Kirchnerism
Left-wing parties in Argentina
Peronist parties and alliances in Argentina
Political parties established in 2004
Social movements in Argentina